Herman Lewis was an American sound engineer. He was nominated for three Academy Awards in the category Best Sound.

Selected filmography
 Tora! Tora! Tora! (1970)
 The Poseidon Adventure (1972)
 The Towering Inferno (1974)

References

External links

Year of birth missing
Year of death missing
American audio engineers